Argentine immigration to France refers to Argentine citizens living in the European country.

Argentina is considered a country of immigrants, especially during the 20th century, but as a result of political, social and economic problems that hit the country in recent decades, many Argentines chose to emigrate, mainly to other countries in the Americas or countries where their parents and/or grandparents came from (mainly Spain and Italy).

History

Background 
The ancestral origins of the Argentine nation show recent ancestors of generations predominantly as Italians and Spanish, but with strong German, British, French, Native American, Slavic and Semitic components, making most Argentinians able to join the European Union. However, they faced very different legal circumstances that Spain and Italy had long before they joined the EU migration policy, thousands of people a day come to the consulates of Spain to process the new nationality or obtain a visa.

Demographics
The 2011 census recorded 3,868 Argentine-born people.

The 2012 census recorded 11,899 Argentine-born people.

Notable people

See also 
 Argentina–France relations
 French Argentine
 Immigration to France
 Uruguayans in France

References 

 
France